Cyphomyrmex flavidus is a species of higher myrmicine in the family Formicidae.

References

Further reading

External links

 

Myrmicinae
Articles created by Qbugbot
Insects described in 1896